Three ships of the French Navy have borne the name Brézé or Maillé Brézé in honour of admiral Jean Armand de Maillé-Brézé:
  (1646–1665), a -gun ship of the line.
  (named Brézé until January 1931), a  destroyed in the accidental explosion of one of her torpedoes on 30 April 1940 in Greenock

Notes

External links 
 Les bâtiments ayant porté le nom de Maillé-Brézé

French Navy ship names